Simple Learning Design 2.0 (SLD 2.0) is a learning design specification proposed by Durand and Downes from the National Research Council of Canada in 2009.
SLD 2.0 is designed to be easily implemented by developers in a commercial e-learning application.  
The intent behind SLD 2.0 was to propose a specification with a good balance between its expressivity and the simplicity of its implementation; all features that might have been deemed too complex to implement were systematically avoided." 
SLD 2.0 can be used as an add-on to IMS Common Cartridge, respecting and reusing the features of IMS-CC.
To implement the specification an XML schema is available online (here) and  explained in the XML Binding Document.

References

Virtual learning environments